M'Borla-Dioulasso is a village in north-eastern Ivory Coast. It is in the sub-prefecture of Sokala-Sobara, Dabakala Department, Hambol Region, Vallée du Bandama District.

M'Borla-Dioulasso was a commune until March 2012, when it became one of 1126 communes nationwide that were abolished.

Notes

Former communes of Ivory Coast
Populated places in Vallée du Bandama District
Populated places in Hambol